Momtazur Rahman Tarafdar (1928–1997) was a Bangladeshi historian and academic.

Early life
Tarafdar was born on 1 August 1928 to a Bengali Muslim family in Meghagacha, Bogra District, Bengal Presidency. After completing his education at Bogra's Azizul Haque College, he enrolled at the University of Dacca in 1947. He completed his Bachelor of Arts from the university in 1949, and undertook his Master of Arts in Islamic History and Culture which was completed in 1951. In the same subject and university, he completed his PhD in 1961.

Career
Tarafdar first job was in Haraganga College in Munshiganj as a lecturer in 1952. He joined University of Dhaka in 1953 as a lecturer where he worked till his death. He had a fellowship in the Nuffield Foundation from 1972 to 1974. In 1997 he got a fellowship in Duke University and in the Bangla Academy; and received the Bangla Academy Literary Award. His PhD thesis, Hussain Shahi Bengal, was published as a book. According to Banglapedia, the national encyclopedia of Bangladesh, the book is considered the most definite work on the history of Bengal. It deals with the administration, art, architecture, economy, literature, and religion of Bengal. He wrote about the Hussain Shahi dynasty. He studied the relationship between Hindi and Bengali medieval poetry. In his essay The Cultural Identity of Bengali Muslims as Reflected in Medieval Bengali Literature he wrote about the arrival of Islam in Bengal and its influence on the people. He was a staunch secularist. He believed history should be divided into periods by economic activity. He was against his contemporaries who divided eras by the religion of those in power,i.e. Christian era, Muslim era, Hindu era etc.

Death
Tarafdar died on 31 July 1997.

References

20th-century Bangladeshi historians
1928 births
1997 deaths
People from Bogra District
University of Dhaka alumni
Academic staff of the University of Dhaka
Recipients of Bangla Academy Award
20th-century Bengalis